Tony Bilbow (born 17 April 1932) is a British television interviewer, film expert and writer. He was a presenter of BBC Television's Late Night Line-Up discussion programme which was broadcast on BBC 2 between 1964 and 1972.

His father was an architect. He was educated at the City of London School, Blackfriars, and began writing short stories for the BBC; he was then the anchorman for Day By Day on Southern Television. He was a screenwriter for the 1970s situation comedy Please Sir! and the spin-off series The Fenn Street Gang and in 1986 was a writer for the BBC soap opera EastEnders. From 1970 to 1973, he presented the film programme Film Night, on which his interviewees included David Niven and Alfred Hitchcock.

Bibliography

References

External links
 Tony Bilbow Alfred Hitchcock Interview 
 

1932 births
Living people
English television presenters
English male writers